SHV may refer to:
Select Harvests, Australia, ASX symbol
Shreveport Regional Airport, IATA code
South View LRT station, Singapore, LRT station abbreviation
South Hills Village, a shopping mall in Pittsburgh, Pennsylvania
South Hills Village station, a Pittsburgh light rail station adjacent to the mall
SHV connector, safe high-voltage
SHV Holdings, a Dutch trading company
Super Hi-Vision, 8K Ultra HD TV